The 2000 FAI Cup Final was the deciding match of the 1999-2000 FAI Cup, the national association football cup of Ireland. It was contested by Shelbourne and Bohemians, both of Dublin. The final went to a replay after the initial match, played at Tolka Park, finished 0–0. Shelbourne won the competition following a 1–0 victory in the replay to secure their first ever league and cup double.

References

FAI Cup finals
Fai Cup Final 2000
Fai Cup Final 2000
Fai Cup Final
FAI Cup Final, 2000
FAI Cup Final
FAI Cup Final